Meaux is a commune on the river Marne in the Seine-et-Marne department in the Île-de-France region in the metropolitan area of Paris, France.

Meaux is, with Provins, Torcy and Fontainebleau, one of the four subprefectures (sous-préfectures) of the department of Seine-et-Marne, Melun being the prefecture. In France a subprefecture is the chef-lieu (the seat or administrative capital) of an arrondissement: Meaux is the subprefecture of the arrondissement of Meaux. It is also the chef-lieu of a smaller administrative division: the canton of Meaux. Finally, since its creation in 2003, Meaux has been the centre and the main town of an agglomeration community, the Communauté d'agglomération du Pays de Meaux.

Demographics
With a population of 55,416 inhabitants in 2018, Meaux is the most populous city in the Seine-et-Marne department, just before Chelles (55,148 inhabitants in 2018).

History and culture
Inhabitants of Meaux are called Meldois. Both names Meaux and Meldois originated with the Meldi, the Latin name of the original Gaulish tribe who occupied this area of the valley of the Marne river. Although during the Roman period the city was called Iantinum by the Romans, the name of the Meldi persisted and was finally kept for naming both the city and its inhabitants.

Historical buildings and monuments in Meaux are mainly located in the old city, inside the old defensive walls, still nowadays partially kept thanks to an important segment of the original surrounding wall from the Gallo-Roman period. A meander of the Marne river divides the old city into the North Quarter (called among the Meldois as the Cathedral Quarter) and the South Quarter (known among the locals as the Market Quarter). In the North Quarter there is the Meaux Cathedral, the episcopal palace and its gardens (outlining the shape of a bishop's mitre), the old seat of the chapter (le vieux chapitre), part of the defensive walls (as mentioned), some keeps and towers, and the archaeological remains of the sanctuary of La Bauve, all-embracing the Gaulish period (4th, 3rd and 1st centuries BC), the era of the early Roman Empire (Gallo-Roman: 1st, 2nd and 3rd centuries AD) and the early Christian Era and subsequent centuries (from the 3rd to the 18th centuries, with the remains, among others, of the Saint-Faron Abbey, demolished during the French Revolution). The South Quarter of the old city mainly includes the historic covered market and the Canal Cornillon, built during the Middle Ages, in the year 1235. Centuries later, in 1806, during the Napoleonic era, was built the Canal de l'Ourcq, destined to the inland navigation when the Marne river is not navigable because of temporary sandbanks.

Meaux is nowadays mainly known for Brie de Meaux (a variety of Brie cheese) and the local variety of mustard. Following the official administrative French AOC there are two designations of Brie de Meaux: Brie de Meaux fermier ("farm Brie de Meaux", made out of the milk from the cows of a single unique producer) and Brie de Meaux laitier (laitier, that is from the French lait, "milk", which designates here an agreement, a mixture of the milk of different producers). The Moutarde de Meaux ("Meaux Mustard") recipe is since the 18th century a label commercially owned by the Pommery company and is nowadays derived not only in its traditional well known form but also in a variety of new different ingredient combinations: Honey Mustard, Green Pepper Mustard, Moutarde Royale (that latter including Cognac in its composition) etc.

Several festivals and concerts are celebrated in Meaux, venues for live music like the Music Festival "Musik'elles" (usually at the end of every summer). There's a local public concert band in Meaux: L'Harmonie du Pays de Meaux. It is constituted by three different ensembles, following different ages: Les Minimes (children), Les Juniors (teenagers) and L'Harmonie de Meaux (adults). The band is also one of the two official music academies of the town. The other one is the conservatory of the city.

Also, every summer for more than 30 years, during several weekends per summer, a show is played by stage actors in the esplanade situated between the cathedral and the episcopal palace: the Spectacle historique ("History show"). The show represents the history of Meaux all along the Middle Ages and the Renaissance, and also, more recently, during World War I (the German advance had been halted at Meaux in 1914 during the First Battle of the Marne).

There is only one cinema in Meaux: The Majestic, a former stage theatre. In modern days there are three stage theatres in the city. One is the Théâtre Gérard Philippe, a private theatre, situated close to the covered market. Not far from the market, in the same area but in a bigger and more recent building, there is the official subsidised theatre of the city, the Théâtre Luxembourg, divided in two separated auditoriums in the same building: the Salle Luxembourg (601 seats) and the Salle du Manège (107 seats). In an eastern area of Meaux, the Beauval quarter, there is the third stage theatre of the town, the Salle Champagne (200 seats), located in the Espace Caravelle, a building dedicated to cultural activities. Private theatre companies and community arts associations play in all three theatres.

Two museums can be found in Meaux: the Musée Bossuet (located in the episcopal palace, this is the art and history museum of Meaux) and the Musée de la Grande Guerre du pays de Meaux [fr] (the largest World War I Museum in the world).

Relevant historical episodes

Middle Ages: Siege of Meaux
The Siege of Meaux took place between October 1421 and May 1422, during the Hundred Years' War between England and France. The besiegers were the English, under Henry V. The town's defence was led by the Bastard of Vaurus, notorious for his savagery. The siege commenced on October 6, 1421, and mining and bombardment soon brought down the walls. Casualties began to mount in the English army, including John Clifford, 7th Baron de Clifford who had been at the siege of Harfleur, the Battle of Agincourt, and received the surrender of Cherbourg. The English also began to fall sick rather early into the siege, and it is estimated that one sixteenth of the besiegers died from dysentery and smallpox. On 9 March 1422, the town surrendered, although the garrison held out. Under continued bombardment, the garrison gave in as well on 10 March, following a siege of six months. The Bastard of Vaurus was decapitated, as was a trumpeter named Orace, who had once mocked King Henry. Sir John Fortescue was then installed as English Captain of Meaux Castle.

World War I: First Battle of the Marne
During the First Battle of the Marne (September 1914), the German troops were stopped at the gates of Meaux. This heroic action not only prevented the city from being taken by the Germans but also changed the course of the war. In 1932, at the place of the battlefield, the people of the United States of America had a monument erected in the memory of the French soldiers fallen in action. Called, in French, La Liberté éplorée ("The Tearful Liberty"), the sculpture by Frederick MacMonnies is popularly known among the French as Le Monument américain ("the American Monument"). Coordinates: 
In 2011, beside the monument was built the Museum of the Great War (Musée de la Grande Guerre du pays de Meaux [fr]).

Sports
The town is represented by the CS Meaux association football club. Many other sports are also practiced in Meaux like rugby or field hockey, especially water sports. There are in Meaux, for example different sporting clubs dealing with canoeing (mainly practiced in the Canal de l'Ourcq), scuba diving (the club "Asterina", named after a starfish genus, trains in the swimming pools of the city), swimming (Club sportif Meaux Natation)

Transport
Meaux is served by Meaux station on the Transilien Paris – Est suburban rail line and on several national rail lines. The rail line connecting Paris to Meaux was established in 1849. The nowadays SNCF train station, still in use, was built in 1890.

Alongside the Meaux rail station there is also the main bus station in the city, with more than 30 bus lines serving the whole eastern Paris metropolitan area.

Education
The commune has 36 public preschools and elementary schools.

Public junior high schools in Meaux:
 C.E.S. Beaumarchais
 C.E.S. Camus
 C.E.S. Henri Dunant
 C.E.S. Frot
 C.E.S. Henri IV

Public senior high schools in Meaux:
 Lycée Jean-Vilar
 Lycée Moissan
 Lycée Pierre de Coubertin
 L.E.P. Charles Beaudelaire
Lycée du Gué A Tresme is in nearby Congis-sur-Thérouanne.

Private Catholic secondary schools:
 Collège International Sainte-Marie
 Lycée Technologique, Professionnel et Post-Bac Jean Rose et son UFA
 Lycée Général International Bossuet et sa Filière Supérieure

People
Yechiel of Paris, rabbi and Tosafist, originally from Meaux
John de Cheam died and is buried in Meaux.
Philippe de Vitry, bishop of Meaux as of 1351, musical composer and author of the Ars Nova Notandi treatise.
Jacques-Bénigne Bossuet, bishop of Meaux from 1681 to 1704, referred to as the "eagle of Meaux" ("l'aigle de Meaux").
Jean-Baptiste de La Noue (1701–1760), 18th-century French playwright
Virginie Courtier-Orgogozo, CNRS research director, biologist
Gilbert du Motier, marquis de Lafayette (1757-1834), French député (delegate) and mayor of Meaux. One of the most trusted aides of George Washington during the American Revolutionary War, he was a general based in Virginia and led French and American troops against the British. 
Albert Guillon (1801–1854), composer
Alexis Soyer (1810-1858), celebrated chef in Victorian London, was born here.
Léon Charles Thévenin (1857-1926), engineer, developed a famous theorem (under his name) for electrical circuits.
L'Aigle de Meaux – fictional character. L'Aigle de Meaux (also Bossuet's nickname) was a character in Victor Hugo's Les Misérables, who petitioned for a post office to be created in Meaux. 
Joop Zoetemelk – Tour de France, Vuelta a España and UCI World Champion cyclist. Zoetemelk and his French wife owned and operated a hotel in Meaux, still open nowadays: Le Richemont.
Jean-François Copé, current mayor of Meaux, député (delegate) for the 6th constituency of Seine-et-Marne, president (2012–2014) of the UMP (Union for a Popular Movement) group in the French National Assembly.
Éric Judor, actor and comedian.
Olivier N'Siabamfumu, footballer.
Chris Mavinga, footballer.
Lucas Digne, footballer.
Djadja & Dinaz, rap duo.

International relations

Meaux is twinned with:
 Basildon, England, United Kingdom
 Heiligenhaus, Germany

See also

 Count of Meaux
 Diocese of Meaux
 Meaux Abbey (UK) (map)
 Battle of Mello
 Brie (cheese)
 Communes of the Seine-et-Marne department

References

External links

Official website 
Pictures of Meaux Cathedral:, 
2003 Land Use, from IAU ÎdF (Institute for Urban Planning and Development of the Paris-Île-de-France région

Bibliography
 Patrice Croisy: Bibliographie de Meaux (Meaux, 2006–2009). This database includes over 8 000 articles and books on Meaux and neighbourhood. Some of them are in English.

Communes of Seine-et-Marne
Subprefectures in France
Gallia Lugdunensis
Champagne (province)